Ahmed Santos (born Hilarion del Rosario Santos III) is a Filipino who converted to Islam while working in Riyadh, Saudi Arabia in 1991. Santos was captured by Military officials for being involved in organizing and planning terrorist activities, including preparation of bombs. He is the founder of the Rajah Solaiman Movement.

Association with terrorism
Santos was detained in October 2005, for taking part in planning bomb attacks in predominantly Christian cities around the Philippines. 
According to police officials, the Rajah Solaiman group founded by Santos after his conversion to Islam, is believed to have forged an alliance with two Islamist organisations - the ISIL-affiliated Abu Sayyaf and the al-Qaida-affiliated Jemaah Islamiah.
Explosives were seized from Santos's room by police on March 26, 2004.
. 
A reward of $500,000 was presented to two Filipino citizens for providing key information that lead to the arrest of Santos.

See also
List of notable converts to Islam
Islamist terrorism
Rajah Solaiman Movement

References

External links
Philippines Terrorism: The Role of Militant Islamic Converts

1966 births
People from Caloocan
Filipino Islamists
Converts to Islam
Living people
Muslims with branch missing
Filipino expatriates in Saudi Arabia
Filipino migrant workers